Roger McCluskey (August 24, 1930 – August 29, 1993) was an American IndyCar driver. He was from Tucson, Arizona.

He won championship titles in three divisions of the United States Auto Club: Sprints, Stocks, and Champ Cars. He won the USAC Sprint Car title in 1963 and 1966, the USAC Stock Car title in 1969 and 1970.  The Champ Car title in 1973.  His first USAC Stock Car start resulted in a runner-up finish in Phoenix, Arizona in January 1968, when he drove as a substitute driver for Norm Nelson.

McCluskey earned four USAC Midget Car wins, 23 USAC Sprint Car wins, 23 USAC Stock Car wins and five USAC Championship Car (national championship) wins (including his last start at Milwaukee in 1979, which is a rarity since most drivers don't win their last race in their career).  He was the USAC national champion in 1973.  He started every Indianapolis 500 race from 1961 to 1979 except 1964, with a best finish of 3rd in 1973.

He also made four NASCAR Grand National Series starts from 1969 to 1977 with a best finish of second in 1970 at Riverside International Raceway.

He represented the USAC series in the 1974 International Race of Champions.

McCluskey raced for the Holman and Moody team in a Ford GT40 Mk.IIB at the 1967 LeMans 24hrs of Endurance, France. During this event, McCluskey is credited with pulling Mario Andretti to safety-and thus saving his life-after Andretti had seriously crashed his Ford GT40 Mk.IV when a front brake locked.

McCluskey died of cancer on August 29, 1993, just five days after his 63rd birthday. In 2004 the local United Sports Arizona Race Park hosted the Roger McCluskey Sprint Car Classic in his honor.

Award
He was inducted in the National Sprint Car Hall of Fame in 1993.

He was also inducted into the Indianapolis Motor Speedway Hall of Fame in 2002.

He was inducted into the Motorsports Hall of Fame of America in 2011.

Racing record

Complete USAC Championship Car results

Complete USAC Mini-Indy Series results

Complete PPG Indy Car World Series results

Indy 500 results

NASCAR
(key) (Bold – Pole position awarded by qualifying time. Italics – Pole position earned by points standings or practice time. * – Most laps led.)

Grand National Series

Winston Cup Series

International Race of Champions
(key) (Bold – Pole position. * – Most laps led.)

References

Other references
Patrick Finley; "McCluskey memorial race at local dirt track gaining momentum each year"; December 30, 2006; Arizona Daily Star; Retrieved January 15, 2007
NASCAR and IROC statistics

1930 births
1993 deaths
Racing drivers from Arizona
Racing drivers from Tucson, Arizona
Champ Car champions
Champ Car drivers
Indianapolis 500 drivers
International Race of Champions drivers
NASCAR drivers
National Sprint Car Hall of Fame inductees
Sportspeople from Tucson, Arizona
24 Hours of Le Mans drivers
World Sportscar Championship drivers
USAC Silver Crown Series drivers
USAC Stock Car drivers
A. J. Foyt Enterprises drivers